Explorer Hop is a Toronto-based company that focuses on teaching children and teens financial literacy, money management, and entrepreneurship.

Educational impact 
In 2021, Explorer Hop launched the Global Investment Challenge for kids. Veronika Kolarska, winner of the first challenge, increased her virtual portfolio from $30,000 to $99 million.

References 

Education companies of Canada